Cyclohexyl chloride (or chlorocyclohexane) is a chlorinated hydrocarbon with the formula (CH2)5CHCl.  It is a colorless liquid.

Cyclohexyl chloride can be prepared from cyclohexanol by treatment with hydrogen chloride.

References

Organochlorides
Cyclohexyl compounds